Dzon or Džon (Cyrillic: "Џон") is an alternate form for the name John.

People by that name
 Dzon Delarge, Congolese football player
 Mathias Dzon, Congolese politician
 Johnny Miljus (Džon Kenet Miljuš), Serbian-American baseball player
 John Lukic (Jovan "Džon" Lukić), English football player
 Timothy John Byford (Тимоти Џон Бајфорд), Serbian-English artist

See also
 Kenyon Jones (basketball) (Kenajn Dzons), American basketball player